West Germany (Federal Republic of Germany) was the host nation of the 1972 Summer Olympics in Munich. 423 competitors, 340 men and 83 women, took part in 183 events in 23 sports.

Medalists
West Germany finished in fourth position in the final medal rankings, with 13 gold medals and 40 medals overall.

Archery

In the first modern archery competition at the Olympics, West Germany entered two men and two women. Their highest placing competitor was Siegfried Ortmann, at 14th place in the men's competition.

Women's Individual Competition:
 Ursula Bueschking - 2200 points (→ 30th place)
 Carla Nolpa - 2165 points (→ 35th place)

Men's Individual Competition:
 Siegfried Ortmann - 2390 points (→ 14th place)
 Richard Krust - 2342 points (→ 30th place)

Athletics

Men's 800 metres
Franz-Josef Kemper
 Heat — 1:47.3 Semifinals — 1:48.8
 Final — 1:46.5 (→ 4th place)

Josef Schmidt
 Heat — 1:47.8
 Semifinals — 1:48.8 (→ did not advance)

Walter Adams
 Heat — DNF (→ did not advance)Men's 1500 metresPaul-Heinz Wellmann
 Heat — 3:41.8
 Semifinals — 3:38.4
 Final — 3:40.1 (→ 7th place)

Thomas Wessinghage
 Heat — 3:40.6
 Semifinals — 3:43.4 (→ did not advance)

Bodo Tümmler
 Heat — 3:44.5
 Semifinals — 3:50.0 (→ did not advance)Men's 5000 metresJürgen May
 Heat — 14:06.6 (→ did not advance)

Wolfgang Riesinger
 Heat — 14:15.2 (→ did not advance)Men's 4 × 100 m RelayJobst Hirscht, Karlheinz Klotz, Gerhard Wucherer, and Klaus Ehl
 Heat — 39.17s
 Semifinals — 38.86s
 Final — 38.79s (→  Bronze Medal)Men's High JumpHermann Magerl
 Qualifying Round — 2.15m
 Final — 2.18m (→ 4th place)

Ingomar Sieghart
 Qualification Round — 2.12m (→ did not advance)

Basketball

Men's Team CompetitionPreliminary Round (Group B) Lost to Puerto Rico (74-81)
 Lost to Soviet Union (63-87)
 Defeated Philippines (93-74)
 Lost to Italy (57-68)
 Lost to Yugoslavia (56-81)
 Defeated Poland (67-65)
 Defeated Senegal (72-62)Classification Matches 13th/16th place: Lost to Australia (69-70)
 11th/12th place: Lost to Spain (83-84) → 12th placeTeam RosterKarl Ampt
Holger Geschwindner
Dietrich Keller
Hans-Jörg Krüger
Dieter Kuprella
Joachim Linnemann
Rainer Pethran
Joachim Pollex
Norbert Thimm
Helmut Uhlig
Klaus Weinand
Jürgen Wohlers

BoxingMen's Flyweight (– 51 kg)Gerd Schubert
 First Round — Defeated Phar Khong (CMB), walkover
 Second Round — Lost to Orn-Chim Chawalit (THA), 1:4Men's Bantamweight (– 54 kg)Werner Schaefer
 First Round — Bye
 Second Round — Lost to Joe Destimo (GHA), 2:3Men's Featherweight (– 57 kg)Peter Prause
 First Round — Lost to Jochen Bachfeld (GDR), 0:5Men's Lightweight (– 60 kg)Peter Hess
 First Round — Bye
 Second Round — Defeated Enrique Requeiferos (CUB), 4:1
 Third Round — Lost to Svein Erik Paulsen (NOR), KO-2Men's Welterweight (– 67 kg)Günther Meier
 First Round — Bye
 Second Round — Defeated Jeff Rackley (NZL), 5:0
 Third Round — Defeated Sangnual Rabieb (THA), 5:0
 Quarterfinals — Lost to Emilio Correa (CUB), 2:3Men's Light Middleweight (– 71 kg)Dieter Kottysch →  Gold Medal First Round — Bye
 Second Round — Defeated Bonifacio Avila (COL), TKO-2
 Third Round — Defeated Evengelos Oikonomakos (GRE), 5:0
 Quarterfinals — Defeated Mohamed Majeri (TUN), 5:0
 Semifinals — Defeated Alan Minter (GBR), 3:2
 Final — Defeated Wiesław Rudkowski (POL), 3:2Men's Middleweight (– 75 kg)Ewald Jarmer
 First Round — Bye
 Second Round — Lost to Marvin Johnson (USA), 0:5Men's Light Heavyweight (– 81 kg)Rudi Hornig
 First Round — Defeated Henri Moreau (FRA), 5:0
 Second Round — Defeated Guglielmo Spinello (ITA), 4:1
 Quarterfinals — Lost to Janusz Gortat (POL), TKO-1Men's Heavyweight (+ 81 kg)Peter Hussing →  Bronze Medal First Round — Bye
 Quarterfinals — Defeated Oscar Ludeña (PER), KO-1
 Semifinals — Lost to Teófilo Stevenson (CUB), TKO-2

Canoeing

Cycling

17 cyclists represented West Germany in 1972.

Individual road race
 Wilfried Trott — 7th place
 Erwin Tischler — 22nd place
 Alfred Gaida — 57th place
 Peter Weibel — 68th place

Team time trial
 Johannes Knab
 Algis Oleknavicius
 Rainer Podlesch
 Erwin Tischler

Sprint
 Karl Köther
 Dieter Berkmann

1000m time trial
 Karl Köther
 Final — 1:07.21 (→ 4th place)

Tandem
 Jürgen Barth and Rainer Müller → 6th place

Individual pursuit
 Hans Lutz

Team pursuit
 Jürgen Colombo
 Günter Haritz
 Udo Hempel
 Günther Schumacher
 Peter Vonhof

DivingMen's 3m Springboard Norbert Huda — 524.16 points (→ 8th place)
 Gerhard Hölzl — 327.42 points (→ 19th place)
 Reinhard vom Bauer — 299.79 points (→ 30th place)Men's 10m Platform Karl-Heinz Schwemmer — 281.55 points (→ 16th place)
 Bernd Wucherpfennig — 267.87 points (→ 24th place)
 Klaus Konzorr — 260.01 points (→ 30th place)Women's 3m Springboard Michaela Herweck — 261.78 points (→ 13th place)Women's 10m Platform Maxie Michael — 183.48 points (→ 15th place)
 Ursula Sapp — 162.39 points (→ 24th place)

Equestrian

Fencing

19 fencers, 13 men and 6 women, represented West Germany in 1972.

Men's foil
 Friedrich Wessel
 Klaus Reichert
 Harald Hein

Men's team foil
 Klaus Reichert, Friedrich Wessel, Harald Hein, Dieter Wellmann, Erk Sens-Gorius

Men's épée
 Hans-Jürgen Hehn
 Reinhold Behr

Men's team épée
 Reinhold Behr, Hans-Jürgen Hehn, Harald Hein, Dieter Jung, Max Geuter

Men's sabre
 Paul Wischeidt
 Walter Convents
 Knut Höhne

Men's team sabre
 Walter Convents, Volker Duschner, Knut Höhne, Dieter Wellmann, Paul Wischeidt

Women's foil
 Irmela Broniecki
 Brigitte Oertel
 Karin Rutz-Gießelmann

Women's team foil
 Gundi Theuerkauff, Irmela Broniecki, Karin Rutz-Gießelmann, Monika Pulch, Erika Bethmann

FootballMen's Team Competition: West Germany - Eliminated in Second Round
 First round: 3-0-0
 Defeat Morocco 3-0
 Defeat Malaysia 3-0
 Defeat the United States 7-0
 Second Round: 0-1-2 (Did not advance)
 Drew with Mexico 1-1
 Lost to Hungary 1-4
 Lost to East Germany 2-3
 Roster - Heiner Baltes, Hermann Bitz, Hartwig Bleidick, Hans-Jürgen Bradler, Friedhelm Haebermann, Ewald Hammes, Ottmar Hitzfeld, Uli Hoeneß, Reiner Hollmann, Jürgen Kalb, Manfred Kaltz, Dieter Mietz, Bernd Nickel, Egon Schmitt, Hans-Dieter Seelmann, Rudi Seliger, Günter Wienhold, Ronald Worm, and Klaus Wunder

Gymnastics

Handball

Men's Team CompetitionPreliminary Round Defeated Spain (13-10)
 Drew with Norway (15-15)
 Lost to Romania (11-13)Main Round Lost to Yugoslavia (15-24)
 Defeated Hungary (17-14)Classification Match 5th/6th place: Lost to Soviet Union (16-17) → Sixth placeTeam RosterHerwig Ahrendsen
Hans-Jürgen Bode
Wolfgang Braun
Peter Bucher
Jochen Feldhoff
Diethard Finkelmann
Josef Karrer
Klaus Kater
Klaus Lange
Herbert Lübking
Heiner Möller
Hans-Peter Neuhaus
Uwe Rathjen
Herbert Rogge
Herbert Wehnert
Klaus Westebbe

Hockey

Men's Team CompetitionPreliminary Round (Group A) Defeated Belgium (5-1)
 Defeated Malaysia (1-0)
 Defeated Argentina (2-1)
 Defeated Pakistan (2-1)
 Drew with Uganda (1-1)
 Defeated Spain (2-1)
 Defeated France (4-0)Semi Final Round Defeated The Netherlands (3-0)Final Defeated Pakistan (1-0) →  Gold MedalTeam Roster Wolfgang Baumgart
 Horst Dröse
 Dieter Freise
 Werner Kaessmann
 Carsten Keller
 Detlev Kittstein
 Ulrich Klaes
 Michael Krause
 Peter Kraus
 Michael Peter
 Wolfgang Rott
 Fritz Schmidt
 Rainer Seifert
 Wolfgang Strödter
 Eckart Suhl
 Eduard Thelen
 Peter Trump
 Uli Vos

Judo

Modern pentathlon

Three male pentathletes represented West Germany in 1972.Men's Individual Competition: Heiner Thade — 5145 points (→ 7th place)
 Walter Esser — 4826 points (→ 20th place)
 Hole Rößler — 4678 points (→ 27th place)Men's Team Competition: Thade, Esser, and Rößler — 14682 points (→ 6th place)Alternate Member Elmar Frings

RowingMen's Single ScullsUdo Hild
Heat — 7:48.12
Repechage — 7:48.11
Semi Finals — 8:26.37
Final — 7:20.81 (→ 4th place)Men's Coxed PairsHeinz Mußmann, Bernd Krauß and Stefan Kuhnke
Heat — 8:02.19
Repechage — 8:07.95
Semi Finals — 8:19.86
Final — 7:21.52 (→ 4th place)

Sailing

Shooting

Fourteen male shooters represented West Germany in 1972. Konrad Wirnhier won gold in the skeet.

25 m pistol
 Helmut Seeger
 Erwin Glock

50 m pistol
 Heinrich Fretwurst
 Heinz Mertel

300 m rifle, three positions
 Dirk Fudickar

50 m rifle, three positions
 Gottfried Kustermann
 Bernd Klingner

50 m rifle, prone
 Silvester Knipfer
 Gottfried Kustermann

50 m running target
 Christoph-Michael Zeisner
 Günther Danne

Trap
 Heinz Leibinger
 Peter Blecher

Skeet
 Konrad Wirnhier
 Walter Wrigge

SwimmingMen's 100m FreestyleKlaus Steinbach
 Heat — 52.91s
 Semifinals — 52.87s
 Final — 52.92s (→ 8th place)

Kersten Meier
 Heat — 53.96s
 Semifinals — 54.35s (→ did not advance)

Gerhard Schiller
 Heat — 54.28s (→  did not advance)Men's 200m FreestyleWerner Lampe
 Heat — 1:55.97
 Final — 1:53.99 (→  Bronze Medal)

Klaus Steinbach
 Heat — 1:55.80
 Final — 1:56.65 (→ 6th place)

Olaf von Schilling
 Heat — 2:00.27 (→ did not advance)Men's 4 × 100 m Freestyle RelayGerhard Schiller, Rainer Jacob, Hans-Günther Vosseler, and Kersten Meier
 Heat — 3:37.59
Klaus Steinbach, Werner Lampe, Rainer Jacob, and Hans Faßnacht
 Final — 3:33.90 (→ 6th place)Men's 4 × 200 m Freestyle RelayHans Faßnacht, Gerhard Schiller, Folkert Meeuw, and Hans-Günther Vosseler
 Heat — 7:53.98
Klaus Steinbach, Werner Lampe, Hans-Günther Vosseler, and Hans Faßnacht
 Final — 7:41.69 (→  Silver Medal)

Volleyball

Water polo

Men's Team CompetitionPreliminary Round (Group B) Drew with Hungary (3-3)
 Drew with the Netherlands (4-4)
 Defeated Greece (3-8)
 Defeated Australia (6-3)Final Round (Group I) Drew with United States (4-4)
 Lost to Soviet Union (2-4)
 Drew with Italy (2-2)
 Lost to Yugoslavia (4-5) → Fourth place Team Roster'''
 Gerd Olbert
 Hermann Haverkamp
 Peter Teicher
 Kurt Küpper
 Günter Wolf
 Ingulf Nossek
 Ludger Weeke
 Kurt Schuhmann
 Jürgen Stiefel
 Hans Georg Simon
 Hans Hoffmeister

Weightlifting

Wrestling

References

Germany, West
1972
Summer Olympics